The 1981–82 NCAA Division I men's basketball season began on November 27, 1981, progressed through the regular season and conference tournaments, and concluded with the 1982 NCAA Division I men's basketball tournament championship game on March 29, 1982, at the Louisiana Superdome in New Orleans, Louisiana. The North Carolina Tar Heels won their second NCAA national championship with a 63–62 victory over the Georgetown Hoyas.

Season headlines 
 Dean Smith won his first national championship as his North Carolina Tar Heels defeated the Georgetown Hoyas 63–62 in New Orleans, Louisiana. It was Smith's first win after three losses in the championship game – including losing the previous year to Indiana.
 John Thompson became the first African-American head coach to lead his team to the Final Four.
 Cincinnati defeated Bradley 75–73 in seven overtimes – the longest game in NCAA Division I history.
 Following the season, the University of San Francisco dropped its basketball program following a scandal involving All-American guard Quintin Dailey. In the process of pleading guilty to assault of a USF coed, Dailey revealed that he had been paid $1000 per month by a Dons booster for a job he never showed up for. This, combined with other blemishes to the program, caused university president John Lo Schiavo to shut down the program. USF would reinstate its basketball program in 1985.
 Texas Southern's Harry Kelly led the nation is scoring and had the highest single-game output with 51 points against Texas College.
 Eastern Illinois, Illinois–Chicago, Loyola (MD), Marist, Maryland–Eastern Shore, Texas–San Antonio, U.S. International, Utica, Western Illinois, Wisconsin–Green Bay and Youngstown State began Division I play.
 The national third-place game was abolished from the NCAA tournament.

Major rule changes 
Beginning in 1981–1982, the following rules changes were implemented:
 The jump ball was only used at the beginning of the game and at the start of each overtime. An alternating arrow was used to indicate possession in jump-ball situations during the game.
 All fouls charged to bench personnel were assessed to the head coach.
 To decrease stalling, two defensive players are required to enter the mid-court area and "continuously and aggressively" attempt to gain control of the ball.
 Causing a backboard to vibrate during a shot or tap is a technical foul.
 Purposely faking a free throw is a violation.
 During free throw attempts, the free throw shooter and any players not in a marked space around the lane are not allowed to enter the lane until the ball touches either the rim or backboard.
 "Break-away" rims, implemented by the NBA after the Darryl Dawkins backboard-shattering dunks, are now permitted.

Season outlook

Pre-season polls 

The top 20 from the AP Poll during the pre-season.

Regular season

Conference winners and tournaments 

Note: From 1975 to 1982, the Eastern College Athletic Conference (ECAC), a loosely organized sports federation of Northeastern colleges and universities, organized Division I ECAC regional tournaments for those of its members that were independents in basketball. Each 1982 ECAC tournament winner received an automatic bid to the 1982 NCAA Division I men's basketball tournament in the same way that the tournament champions of conventional athletic conferences did. After this season, all remaining Northeastern independents joined conventional conferences, and the ECAC discontinued Division I basketball tournaments. The ECAC North was a separate, conventional conference.

Informal championships

Statistical leaders

Conference standings

Key

Postseason tournaments

NCAA tournament 

North Carolina freshman Michael Jordan hit the game-winning shot as Dean Smith won his first national championship after many near-misses over his career, defeating the Georgetown Hoyas 63–62 at the Louisiana Superdome in New Orleans. Fred Brown's errant pass to James Worthy in the closing seconds sealed the game, which featured star freshmen Jordan and the Hoyas' Patrick Ewing. Worthy was named Final Four Most Outstanding Player.

Final Four – Louisiana Superdome, New Orleans

National Invitation tournament 

The Bradley Braves, led by coach Dick Versace, defeated the Purdue Boilermakers 67–58 to win their fourth National Invitation Tournament, tying them with St. John's for the most NIT championships (St. John's has since won two additional titles). Bradley's Mitchell Anderson was named NIT Most Valuable Player.

NIT Semifinals and Final 
Played at Madison Square Garden in New York City

Awards

Consensus All-American teams

Major player of the year awards 

 Wooden Award: Ralph Sampson, Virginia
 Naismith Award: Ralph Sampson, Virginia
 Helms Player of the Year: Ralph Sampson, Virginia, & James Worthy, North Carolina
 Associated Press Player of the Year: Ralph Sampson, Virginia
 UPI Player of the Year: Ralph Sampson, Virginia
 NABC Player of the Year: Ralph Sampson, Virginia
 Oscar Robertson Trophy (USBWA): Ralph Sampson, Virginia
 Adolph Rupp Trophy: Ralph Sampson, Virginia
 Sporting News Player of the Year: Ralph Sampson, Virginia

Major coach of the year awards 

 Associated Press Coach of the Year: Ralph Miller, Oregon State
 Henry Iba Award (USBWA): John Thompson, Georgetown
 NABC Coach of the Year: Don Monson, Idaho
 UPI Coach of the Year: Norm Stewart, Missouri
 CBS/Chevrolet Coach of the Year: Gene Keady, Purdue
 Sporting News Coach of the Year: Ralph Miller, Oregon State

Other major awards 

 Frances Pomeroy Naismith Award (Best player under 6'0): Jack Moore, Nebraska
 Robert V. Geasey Trophy (Top player in Philadelphia Big 5): Jeffery Clark, St. Joseph's & John Pinone, Villanova
 NIT/Haggerty Award (Top player in New York City metro area): Dan Callandrillo, Seton Hall

Coaching changes 
A number of teams changed coaches throughout the season and after the season ended.

References 

 
NCAA